Pole sitting is the practice of sitting on top of a pole (such as a flagpole) for extended lengths of time, generally used as a test of endurance. A small platform is typically placed at the top of the pole for the sitter. Led by the stunt actor and former sailor Alvin "Shipwreck" Kelly, flagpole sitting was a fad in the mid-to-late 1920s, but mostly died out after the start of the Great Depression.

History and 1920s fad
Pole sitting is predated by the ancient ascetic discipline of stylitism, or column-sitting. St. Simeon Stylites the Elder (c. 388–459) of Antioch (now Turkey) was a column-sitter who sat on a small platform on a column for 36 years.

Flagpole sitting was a fad in the mid-to-late 1920s. The fad was begun by stunt actor and former sailor Alvin "Shipwreck" Kelly, who sat on a flagpole, either on a dare by a friend  or as a publicity stunt.  Shipwreck's initial 1924 sit lasted 13 hours and 13 minutes.  It soon became a fad with other contestants setting records of 12, 17 and 21 days.  In 1929, Shipwreck decided to reclaim the title.  He sat on a flagpole for 49 days in Atlantic City, New Jersey, setting a new record. The following year, 1930, his record was broken by Bill Penfield in Strawberry Point, Iowa who sat on a flagpole for 51 days and 20 hours, until a thunderstorm forced him down.

For the most part, pole sitting was confined to the 1920s, ending with the onset of the Depression.

Post-1930 incidents and records
In 1946, Marshall Jacobs, a 37-year-old Ohio resident who was trying to revive the fad, married his fiancée Yolanda Cosmar atop a flagpole with a roost, and a photograph of them kissing gained wide attention.
From 1933 to 1963, Richard "Dixie" Blandy claimed various records as champion at 77, 78 and 125 days until he died in 1974 when the pole on which he was sitting collapsed. 
In 1964 a record of 217 days was set in Gadsden, Alabama by Peggy (Townsend) Clark.
From November 1982 to 21 January 1984 (439 days, 11 hours, and 6 minutes), H. David Werder sat on a pole to protest against the price of gasoline.

Television 
On the game show What's My Line, hosted by John Charles Daly, a flagpole sitter is the first guest on the July 3, 1955 episode.
Pole sitting is worked into the plot of the season 5 episode of M*A*S*H entitled "Souvenirs."  For his latest scheme to get a section 8 discharge, Corporal Klinger climbs a pole in the middle of camp and refuses to come down until he is granted his discharge.  When Colonel Potter learns that the Army record for pole sitting is 96 hours, he turns the tables by convincing Klinger to stay up there to break the record.

Film 
In a dialog sequence early in the 1932 movie The Most Dangerous Game, the character Zaroff introduces the protagonist Bob to his guests as a celebrity, upon which Martin guesses (incorrectly) that Bob might be a flagpole sitter.

See also
Tree sitting
Stylites
Planking (fad)
Panty raid
Goldfish swallowing
Phonebooth stuffing

References

1920s fads and trends
Asceticism